Helen Hodgman (27 April 1945 – 6 June 2022) was an Australian novelist. She won the 1978 Somerset Maugham Award for her novel Jack and Jill. She also won the 1989 Christina Stead Fiction Prize for the novel Broken Words.


Career 
Hodgman was born in Aberdeen, Scotland. On publication of her first novel, British critic Auberon Waugh, referred to her as "a born writer with a style and an elan which is all her own".

In 1983 Hodgman was diagnosed with Parkinson's disease, which, by 2001 had deprived her of the ability to write. She died in 2022 aged 77 in Sydney.

Works

Novels 

 Blue Skies, London: Duckworth, 1976 ; translated into German: Gleichbleibend schön (2012) 
 Jack and Jill, London: Duckworth, 1978 ; translated into German: Jack & Jill (2015) 
 Broken Words, Ringwood, Victoria: Penguin, 1988 ; US edition: Ducks, Harmony, 1989 
 Waiting for Matindi, St Leonards, NSW: Allen & Unwin, 1998 
 Passing Remarks, Sydney: Anchor Books, 1996 
 The Bad Policeman, Crows Nest, NSW: Allen & Unwin, 2001

Screenplay
 The Right Hand Man, for the 1987 film directed by Di Drew and starring Rupert Everett, Hugo Weaving and Arthur Dignam, based on the 1977 novel of the same name by K. M. Peyton.

References 

1945 births
2022 deaths
20th-century Australian novelists
21st-century Australian novelists
Australian women novelists
20th-century Australian women writers
21st-century Australian women writers
Scottish emigrants to Australia
Writers from Aberdeen